The Jaime Brunet International Prize was established in 1998 with the objective of distinguishing people, organizations and institutions that promote the defence of human rights. It is awarded by the Jaime Brunet Foundation of the UPNA (Public University of Navarre). This award also aims to recognize the work of those who fight to eliminate situations of inhumane or degrading treatment in violation of people's inherent rights to dignity. The prize consists of a diploma, a sculpture commemorating the award and €36,000 in cash.

Jaime Brunet Romero
Jaime Brunet Romero (born July 20, 1926) was of a family that settled in Guipúzcoa in the 18th century. He studied law at the University of Valladolid, where he would later serve as assistant professor. Through his travels,  he came to understand the extent of discrimination, violence and abuse committed by the  powerful affecting the weak, and how people's most basic rights were infringed every day. He used his fortune to create a foundation that, after his death, would be dedicated to promoting human rights.  Brunet died on January 4, 1992, in San Sebastián (Guipúzcoa, Spain).

The Jaime Brunet Romero Foundation 
The headquarters of the Jaime Brunet Romero Foundation are in the Public University of Navarre. It is a permanent, private cultural foundation dedicated to projects of social interest. Through its activities, it promotes respect for human dignity and the elimination of inhumane or degrading situations or treatment. In addition to the Jaime Brunet International Prize, the Jaime Brunet University Prize has  been awarded since 2014 to highlight research pursuing such issues. Additionally,  since 2017 the Brunet Doctoral Thesis Award has been granted to give recognition to theses with research content directly related to the defense and promotion of human rights.

Prize winners 
 1998, Amnesty International
 1999, Akin Birdal
 2000, Cristina Cuesta Gorostidi
 2001, Dalai Lama
 2002, Cecilio de Lora and Carolina Agudelo
 2003, Tim Modise
 2004, Manos Unidas
 2005, Mercedes Navarro
 2006, José María Caballero and El Compromiso Foundation
 2007, Jon Cortina Garaigorta
 2008, Jürgen Habermas
 2010, Yoani María Sánchez
 2011, Peace Brigades International
 2012, Natty Petrosino
 2013, International Committee of the Red Cross
 2014, Gervasio Sánchez
 2015, Thelma Esperanza Aldana Hernández
 2016, Reprieve
 2017, Vicente Ferrer Foundation
 2018 (not granted)
 2019, United Nations High Commissioner for Refugees ACNUR 
 2020, El papa Francisco

References

External links 
 The Jaime Brunet International Prize official site Public University of Navarre, Navarre, Spain

Human rights awards
Awards established in 1998